Rajya Sabha elections were held on various dates in 1977, to elect members of the Rajya Sabha, Indian Parliament's upper chamber.

Elections
Elections were held to elect members from various states.

Members elected
The following members are elected in the elections held in 1979. They are members for the term 1977-1983 and retire in year 1983, except in case of the resignation or death before the term.
The list is incomplete.

State - Member - Party

Bye-elections
The following bye elections were held in the year 1977.

State - Member - Party

 Haryana - Sujan Singh  - INC ( ele  13/07/1977 term till 1978)
 WB - Ananda Pathak - CPM ( ele  13/07/1977 term till 1978)
 Orissa - Patitpaban Pradhan - LD ( ele  13/07/1977 term till 1982)
 Karnataka - T V Chandrasekharappa -  INC ( ele  14/07/1977 term till 1978 )
 Karnataka - L G Havanur -  INC ( ele  14/07/1977 term till 1978 )
 Uttar Pradesh - Narendra Singh - JAN ( ele  14/07/1977 term till 1978 )
 Uttar Pradesh - Dr M M S Siddhu - JAN ( ele  14/07/1977 term till 1978 )
 Madhya Pradesh - Baleshwar Dayal - JAN ( ele  14/07/1977 term till 1978 )
 Uttar Pradesh - Dinesh Singh - JAN ( ele  14/07/1977 term till 1980 )
 Uttar Pradesh - K B Asthana  - JP ( ele  14/07/1977 term till 1980 )
 Uttar Pradesh - Shanti Bhushan - JP ( ele  14/07/1977 term till 1980 )
 Uttar Pradesh - Prem Manohar - JP ( ele  14/07/1977 term till 1980 )
 Andhra Pradesh - N. G. Ranga - INC ( ele  18/07/1977 term till 1980 ) 08/01/1980
 Tamil Nadu - E R Krishnan - AIADMK ( ele  18/07/1977 term till 1980 )
 Gujarat - Trilok Gogoi -  INC ( ele  20/07/1977 term till 1980 )
 Karnataka - L R Naik -  INC ( ele  20/07/1977 term till 1980 )
 Kerala - Thalekkunnil Basheer  - INC INC ( ele  20/07/1977 term till 1979 )

References

1977 elections in India
1977